Chatham-Kent Municipal Airport  is located  southeast of Chatham-Kent, Ontario, Canada.

The airport is owned and operated by the Municipality of Chatham–Kent. It is managed by Z3 Aviation. Several local pilots and businesses are tenants in various hangars.

Chatham-Kent Municipal Airport was previously identified as CNZ3. This change occurred on September 20, 2012.

References

External links
Official site
Page about this airport on COPA's Places to Fly airport directory
Z3Aviation Chatham-Kent Airport Information and more.

Certified airports in Ontario
Transport in Chatham-Kent
Buildings and structures in Chatham-Kent